Sanford Everret Charron (May 13, 1917March 1, 2008) was a Michigan politician.

Early life and education
Sanford E. Charron was born on May 13, 1917 in Crawford County, Michigan to parents Oscar Edward Charron and Antoinette May Charron. Sanford graduated high school.

Career
Charron served in the United States Army Corps of Engineers. Charron worked as a service station operator. Charron had served as a township clerk and a councilman. On November 4, 1964, Charron was elected to the Michigan House of Representatives seat representing the 102nd district. Charron assumed office on January 1, 1965 and was sworn into the office on January 13, 1965. In 1966, Charron sought re-election, but was defeated in the Democratic primary that year. Charron left office on January 1, 1967. In 1968, Charron ran for the same state house seat as a Republican, but was again defeated.

Personal life
During his time in the legislature, Charron lived in Pinconning, Michigan. In 1937, Charron married Loretta Virginia Sorenson. Together, they had five children. Charron was a member of the Lions Club and the Disabled American Veterans. Charron was Lutheran.

Death
Charron died on March 1, 2008. Charron was interred at Oakwood Cemetery in Crawford County.

References

1917 births
2008 deaths
American Lutherans
Burials in Michigan
City and town clerks
Members of the Michigan House of Representatives
Michigan Democrats
Michigan Republicans
People from Crawford County, Michigan
People from Pinconning, Michigan
United States Army Corps of Engineers personnel
20th-century American politicians